Lokesh Anand (born March 13, 1978) is an Indian shehnai player. Lokesh has been learning under Sangeet Martand Pandit Jasraj, Hence belongs to Mewati Gharana.
He is empanelled with the Indian Council for Cultural Relations (Government of India). The key characteristics of Anand's Shehnai playing are neat fingering techniques, command over tempo along with richness and clarity in sound. Lokesh performs solo and in duet and also does fusion.

Early life and training 
Anand was born in Delhi and started receiving training from his father, Kalicharan when Lokesh was 8 years old. His father taught him the basic technique which separates him from others. Later in life, Lokesh received training from Pandit Anant Lal, Pandit Dayashankar lokesh further developed vocal nuances by becoming a disciple of SANGEET MARTAND PANDIT JASRAJ of the mewati gharan.

Key performances 

Taj Mahotsav, Agra
 Vishnu Digambar Sammelan, Agra
 A Chinese Concert in Drama
 Harivallabh Festival, Jalandhar
 Sangeet Utsav Patiala
Tansen Samaroh, Gwalior
 Sankatmochan Sangeet Samaroh, Varanasi
Saptak Festival 
Sur Benaras
Saptak Classical Music Festival
Akashvani sangeet sammelan

Online Performances 

 Online concerts during Covid 19

Background music 
Lokesh has played shehnai in background score of bollywood movie Mimi (2021 Hindi film) under A.R. Rehman.

Awards and recognition 
Surmani award in 1997
Shehnai Ratna Award in 2010
 Sangeet Sadhak in 2004
 Sangeet Ratna in 2005
Yash Kala Samman
Abhinav Kala Samman
swarveni Ratna Samman
Anhad Naad Brahma Award
Sangeet Kala Gaurav Award

References 

Shehnai players
Hindustani instrumentalists
20th-century Indian musicians
1978 births
Living people